Antonova is a feminine Russian surname that as the female version of Antonov is derived from the male given name Anton and literally means Anton's. I.e., it is a patronymic surname derived from the Antonius root name. It may refer to:

 Aleksandra Antonova (born 1980), Russian hurdler
 Aleksandra Andreevna Antonova (1932–2014), Russian, Kildin Sámi teacher, writer, poet, translator
 Alexandra Antonova (born 1991), Russian water polo player
 Anastasia Oberstolz-Antonova (born 1981), Soviet/Russian-born, Italian luger
 Anna Antonova (born 1965), Soviet figure skater
 Diana Antonova (born 1993), Russian water polo player
 Elena Antonova (skier) (born 1971), Kazak cross-country skier
 Irina Antonova (born 1922), the Director of the Pushkin Museum of Fine Arts in Moscow for 52 years, from 1961 to 2013
 Koka Antonova (1910 – 2007), Soviet Indologist
 Ksenia Antonova (born 1990), Russian ice dancer
 Natalia Antonova (born 1995), Russian cyclist
 Natalya Antonova, Russian pianist
 Olena Antonova (born 1972), Ukrainian discus thrower
 Olga Antonova (athlete) (born 1960), Soviet sprint athlete
 Svetlana Antonova (born 1979), Russian actress
 Yelena Antonova (cyclist), Kazakhstani cyclist
 Yelena Antonova (rower) (born 1952), Soviet rower
 Yelena Antonova (synchronised swimmer) (born 1974), Russian swimmer

See also

Andonova
Antonov (surname)
Antonovna

Notes

Patronymic surnames